Sasho Pargov (born 25 June 1946) is a former Bulgarian footballer who played as a central forward. He played with Marek Dupnitsa and earned 465 caps, scoring 167 goals. He also played in Marek's UEFA Cup Winners' Cup tie against Alex Ferguson's Aberdeen in 1978.

Pargov's son, Ivo, is a former footballer who also played for Marek during his career.

Honours
 Bulgarian Cup: 1978
 Championship's top goalscorer in B PFG: 1968 (21 goals), 1973 (27 goals)

References

1946 births
Living people
Bulgarian footballers
Association football forwards
PFC Marek Dupnitsa players
First Professional Football League (Bulgaria) players
Second Professional Football League (Bulgaria) players